New Hackensack is an unincorporated community and census-designated place (CDP) in the town of Wappinger in Dutchess County, New York, United States. It was first listed as a CDP prior to the 2020 census.

New Hackensack is in western Dutchess County, in the northeastern section of Wappinger. It is bordered to the southwest by the Myers Corner CDP and to the west by the Hudson Valley Regional Airport, formerly known as Dutchess County Airport and originally known as "New Hackensack Field" in the 1930s and 1940s. New York State Route 376 passes through the community, leading north  to Poughkeepsie and southeast  to Hopewell Junction.

Demographics

References 

Census-designated places in Dutchess County, New York
Census-designated places in New York (state)